Penn Valley is a census-designated place (CDP) in Nevada County, California. The population was 1,621 at the 2010 census, up from 1,387 at the 2000 census.

History
The community may be named for Madame Penn, the original owner of the town site.

Geography
Penn Valley is located at  (39.198214, -121.188965).

Demographics

2010
The 2010 United States Census reported that Penn Valley had a population of 1,621. The racial makeup of Penn Valley was 1,434 (88.5%) White, 9 (0.6%) African American, 34 (2.1%) Native American, 23 (1.4%) Asian, 0 (0.0%) Pacific Islander, 31 (1.9%) from other races, and 90 (5.6%) from two or more races. Hispanic or Latino of any race were 143 persons (8.8%).

The Census reported that 1,611 people (99.4% of the population) lived in households, 10 (0.6%) lived in non-institutionalized group quarters, and 0 (0%) were institutionalized.

There were 628 households, out of which 195 (31.1%) had children under the age of 18 living in them, 301 (47.9%) were opposite-sex married couples living together, 91 (14.5%) had a female householder with no husband present, 41 (6.5%) had a male householder with no wife present. There were 36 (5.7%) unmarried opposite-sex partnerships, and 3 (0.5%) same-sex married couples or partnerships. 163 households (26.0%) were made up of individuals, and 74 (11.8%) had someone living alone who was 65 years of age or older. The average household size was 2.57. There were 433 families (68.9% of all households); the average family size was 3.02.

The population was spread out, with 363 people (22.4%) under the age of 18, 136 people (8.4%) aged 18 to 24, 321 people (19.8%) aged 25 to 44, 506 people (31.2%) aged 45 to 64, and 295 people (18.2%) who were 65 years of age or older. The median age was 44.5 years. For every 100 females, there were 93.7 males. For every 100 females age 18 and over, there were 89.2 males.

The homeowner vacancy rate was 2.6%; the rental vacancy rate was 3.3%. 1,186 people (73.2% of the population) lived in owner-occupied housing units and 425 people (26.2%) lived in rental housing units.

2000
As of the census of 2000, there were 1,387 people, 530 households, and 383 families residing in the CDP. The racial makeup of the CDP was 93.4% White, 0.8% African American, 0.6% Native American, 0.7% Asian, 5.5% from other races, and 2.4% from two or more races. Hispanic or Latino of any race were 12.5% of the population.

There were 530 households, out of which 32.8% had children under the age of 18 living with them, 55.3% were married couples living together, 12.1% had a female householder with no husband present, and 27.7% were non-families. 20.6% of all households were made up of individuals, and 9.4% had someone living alone who was 65 years of age or older. The average household size was 2.62 and the average family size was 3.03.

In the CDP, the population was spread out, with 27.0% under the age of 18, 4.8% from 18 to 24, 26.2% from 25 to 44, 26.3% from 45 to 64, and 15.6% who were 65 years of age or older. The median age was 40 years. For every 100 females, there were 95.9 males. For every 100 females age 18 and over, there were 93.5 males.

The median income for a household in the CDP was $35,962, and the median income for a family was $37,115. Males had a median income of $33,068 versus $21,133 for females. The per capita income for the CDP was $16,582. About 9.2% of families and 13.0% of the population were below the poverty line, including 22.7% of those under age 18 and 6.6% of those age 65 or over.

Politics

Recreation
Lake Wildwood
Englebright Lake
Yuba River
Bridgeport Covered Bridge

Tourism
Penn Valley hosts a rodeo event each year in late Spring and has attracted as many as 5,000 spectators during one of its events.  The Penn Valley Rodeo is organized by Penn Valley Community Rodeo Association since 2005.
In the 1950s, the Penn Valley Fire Dept. needed funds. George Alan Smith, a local cowboy and heavy equipment operator, came up with the idea of holding a rodeo. George talked Pegar (of Pegar's 'Y') into donating the land, and then he leveled and build the grounds with his D-9 CAT bull-dozer. George enlisted the help of friends and relatives on weekends, evenings, and holidays to set posts, build fence and chutes, and put up bleachers. George, a WWII Navy Vet, was the nephew of Jay and Bessie Peacock, owners of the Peacock Ranch (at the top of Pet Hill). In 1951, he married Lynn Margaret Gleason, daughter of Harold & Mildred Gleason who owned the Lazy Valley Angus Ranch, which was the original stage stop between Reno and Sacramento during the Gold Rush. As they built the arena, George and Lynn organized the weekend calf-ropings there. Lynn and other ropers' wives put together a refreshment stand, and their children collected pop bottles under the bleachers, turning them in for the refunds. All of this served to work out any problems with the arena before the big event. The first Penn Valley Rodeos featured intermission entertainment provided by local rancher, Larry Filer and his horse, Jim. Larry claimed that he never trained Jim, and that Jim initiated all his humorous antics. Jim would pull the handkerchief out of Larry's back pocket, count, play dead, take a nap and steal the covers, steal Larry's hat, etc. The first rodeo was a success, and it took on a life of its own. The local Fire Department and residents volunteered their time and efforts to help put on the annual event. The Penn Valley Rodeo quickly became "the summer event" for people from all over California to attend.

Notable residents
Chuck Yeager, retired General in the United States Air Force and first man to break the sound barrier.
Tanner Vallejo, NFL football player.

References

Census-designated places in Nevada County, California
Census-designated places in California